Berkeley Lloyd Bunker (August 12, 1906 – January 21, 1999) was a United States senator and representative from Nevada.

Early life
Born in what was then St. Thomas, Clark County, Nevada (now a northern arm of Lake Mead), he attended public schools, graduating from Clark County High School in 1926. Bunker married Lucile Whitehead, then entered the tire and oil business in Las Vegas in 1934.

Career
The Democrat Bunker was a member of the Nevada Assembly from 1936 to 1941, serving as speaker in 1939. When United States Senator Key Pittman died just after reelection in 1940, many candidates sought to be appointed as replacement. On November 26, Governor Edward P. Carville surprised the state and appointed Bunker as Pittman's replacement for the term ending January 3, 1941, and also for the term ending January 3, 1947, serving until December 6, 1942, when a duly elected successor qualified.

The young new senator, whom Carville likely chose as a compromise candidate because (as an observer later said) "Nobody was mad at Berkeley Bunker", later claimed to be the "most surprised man in the state" as he had not asked for the job. Bunker was the first southern Nevadan, and first Nevadan Mormon, to serve in federal office. As a senator he made headlines by accusing Basic Magnesium of having negotiated a contract with the government to get exorbitant profits.

Bunker lost to former governor James Scrugham in the Democratic primary for the 1942 special election but was elected in 1944 as a Democrat to Nevada's only House seat after he had defeated incumbent Maurice Sullivan in the primary and Republican former actor Rex Bell in the general election. In 1946 he introduced a bill to incorporate Boulder City, Nevada, removing it from federal control, but the bill never made it out of committee.

When Scrugham died in 1945 Carville resigned so that Lieutenant Governor Vail Pittman would succeed him and appoint him to the vacancy. In what he later called "the biggest mistake of my political career", instead of running for reelection to the House, Bunker challenged Carville in the Democratic primary for the 1946 election. Bunker won, but according to fellow Democrats, he had committed what the Las Vegas Review-Journal later described as the "heinous crime of political ingratitude, becoming a party pariah." Observers expected Bunker to easily defeat Republican George Malone, but the Democratic vote was divided and Malone won.

Bunker became a hotel manager and then joined his brother in founding the Bunker Brothers mortuary. Bunker ran for lieutenant governor in 1962 but lost to Republican Paul Laxalt, in part because former Carville supporters still resented his defeat of their candidate in 1946.

Death
His wife Lucile Bunker died in 1988. He soon married Della Lee in 1989. Bunker died in 1999 and was interred in Bunker's Eden Vale Cemetery. He was the last living senator who was serving at the time of the United States' declaration of war on Japan, which precipitated the United States' participation in World War II, and was the last living person who had served as a senator during the time FDR was president. Berkeley L. Bunker Elementary School in Las Vegas is named after him.

Personal life
Bunker was a member of the Church of Jesus Christ of Latter-day Saints. He served a mission for the church in the southern United States after high school and before his marriage. After his time in the Senate, Bunker served as bishop of a LDS ward in Las Vegas, and was involved with the building of the Las Vegas Nevada Temple.

References

|-

|-

|-

1906 births
1999 deaths
20th-century Mormon missionaries
American Mormon missionaries in the United States
Democratic Party members of the Nevada Assembly
Democratic Party United States senators from Nevada
People from Clark County, Nevada
American leaders of the Church of Jesus Christ of Latter-day Saints
Democratic Party members of the United States House of Representatives from Nevada
20th-century American politicians
Latter Day Saints from Nevada